A couturier is a person who creates original garments for clients. The word may also refer to:

Couturier (surname)
5439 Couturier, an asteroid